Glenea sylvia is a species of beetle in the family Cerambycidae. It was described by James Thomson in 1879. It is known from Gabon.

References

Endemic fauna of Gabon
sylvia
Beetles described in 1879